Smith Glacier is a low-gradient Antarctic glacier, over 160 km (100 mi) long, draining from Toney Mountain in an ENE direction to Amundsen Sea. A northern distributary, Kohler Glacier, drains to Dotson Ice Shelf but the main flow passes to the sea between Bear Peninsula and Mount Murphy, terminating at Crosson Ice Shelf. 

The Smith Glacier is located in the western region of Antarctica. Latitude: 75° 2' 59'' S. Longitude 111° 12' 0'' W.

Mapped by USGS from ground surveys and USN air photos, 1959–65. Named by US-ACAN after Philip M. Smith (Smith Bluffs), Deputy Director, Office of Polar Programs, National Science Foundation, who in the period 1956–71 participated in many expeditions to Antarctica in field and supervisory capacities.

In 2001, Dr. Andrew Shepherd, a research fellow at the Center for Polar Observation and Modeling at University College London, said that Smith Glacier was losing mass quickly and contributing to the slow rise of the oceans. 

In 2011, Hamish Pritchard, a scientist with the British Antarctic Survey in Cambridge, UK, said that Smith Glacier was thinning at a rate of 27 feet per year.

In 2016, a study published in the journal Nature Communication, which relied on airborne radar measurements, found that melting of the ice shelves’ grounding zones between the years 2000 and 2009 removed between 984 to about 1,607 feet of solid ice beneath the Smith Glacier. The Smith Glacier lost more ice than any other glacier studied for the report. The researchers found that the Smith Glacier retreated by about 21 miles during the period from 1996 to 2011. The scientists concluded that the size of the retreat was partly a result of both the unique topography underneath the ice that allowed more ocean water to sneak in between the ice and the land below.

See also
 Ice stream
 List of glaciers in the Antarctic
 List of Antarctic ice streams

References

Ice streams of Marie Byrd Land